The Neognathostomata are a superorder of sea urchins.

Description and characteristics 
They are distinguished from other sea urchins by their irregular shape and a highly modified feeding lantern. The group includes the well known sand dollars, as well as some less familiar and extinct forms.

Taxonomy 

 familia Apatopygidae Kier, 1962
 familia Archiaciidae Cotteau & Triger, 1869 †
 order Cassiduloida
 Super-familia Cassidulina (Philip, 1963b)
 familia Cassidulidae (L. Agassiz and Desor, 1847)
 Super-familia Neolampadina (Philip, 1963b)
 familia Neolampadidae (Lambert, 1918a)
 familia Pliolampadidae (Kier, 1962) †
 order Clypeasteroida A.Agassiz, 1872 ("sand dollars")
 sous-order Clypeasterina
 familia Clypeasteridae L. Agassiz, 1835
 familia Fossulasteridae Philip & Foster, 1971 †
 familia Scutellinoididae Irwin, 1995 †
 familia Conoclypidae von Zittel, 1879 †
 familia Faujasiidae Lambert, 1905 †
 familia Oligopygidae Duncan, 1889 †
 familia Plesiolampadidae Lambert, 1905 †
 sous-order Scutellina
 infra-order Laganiformes
 familia Echinocyamidae Lambert & Thiéry, 1914
 familia Fibulariidae Gray, 1855
 familia Laganidae Desor, 1858
 infra-order Scutelliformes
 familia Echinarachniidae Lambert in Lambert & Thiéry, 1914
 familia Eoscutellidae Durham, 1955 †
 familia Protoscutellidae Durham, 1955 †
 familia Rotulidae Gray, 1855
 super-familia Scutellidea Gray, 1825
 familia Abertellidae Durham, 1955 †
 familia Astriclypeidae Stefanini, 1912
 familia Dendrasteridae Lambert, 1900
 familia Mellitidae Stefanini, 1912
 familia Monophorasteridae Lahille, 1896 †
 familia Scutasteridae Durham, 1955 †
 familia Scutellidae Gray, 1825
 familia Taiwanasteridae Wang, 1984
 familia Scutellinidae Pomel, 1888a †
 familia Clypeidae Lambert, 1898 †
 familia Clypeolampadidae Kier, 1962 †
 order Echinolampadoida
 familia Echinolampadidae Gray, 1851a
 familia Nucleolitidae L. Agassiz & Desor, 1847 †
 familia Pygaulidae Lambert, 1905 †
 genus Pygolampas'' Saucède, Dudicourt & Courville, 2012 †

References
 
 

Echinoidea